We Are All Pan's People is an album by Julian House, under the pseudonym of The Focus Group. It was released on 26 March, 2007 on the Ghost Box Music label. The title and artwork owe a simultaneous debt to the 1970s dance troupe Pan's People and the stories - the novella The Great God Pan specifically - of Arthur Machen; labelmates Eric Zann and Belbury Poly have also acknowledged a debt to the author.

Track listing

External links
Ghost Box Music page
Review in The Wire issue 278

The Focus Group albums
Ghost Box Music albums
2007 albums